Personal Conversation is the second studio album by American R&B singer Case. It was released by the Def Soul subsidiary of Def Jam Recordings on April 20, 1999. It features the hit single "Happily Ever After". The album was certified Gold by the Recording Industry Association of America (RIAA).

Critical reception 

Jose F. Promis of AllMusic said that Case is at his strongest "when the songs are mid- to up-tempo," and found the slow jams tending to meander towards the album's end and "a little less interesting than the others", noting how he comes across as "a sentimental and earnest singer, who delivers his sincere messages straight from the heart." He concludes that, "Perhaps this can explain this singer's enduring appeal, which has resulting in his being one of the most consistent and successful R&B singers to have emerged in the 1990s." Vibe contributor Craig Seymour was critical of Case's vocal performance throughout the record, saying his voice "lacks the soul pathos of an R. Kelly, nor does he have the dewy R&B feel of his buddy Joe" on the ballads and "isn't fluid enough to ignite the warmed-over samples he uses" on the upbeat tracks, concluding that "[T]he album might be a bit boring but, knowing Case, he's probably only another choice collaboration away from scoring a third hit."

Track listing

Notes
 denotes co-producer

Charts

Weekly charts

Year-end charts

Certifications

References

1999 albums
Case (singer) albums
Def Jam Recordings albums